Rondeletia cincta is a species of plant in the family Rubiaceae. It is endemic to Jamaica.  It is threatened by habitat loss.

References

Flora of Jamaica
cincta
Critically endangered plants
Endemic flora of Jamaica
Taxonomy articles created by Polbot